Robin Geoffrey Marlar (2 January 1931 – 30 September 2022) was an English cricketer and cricket journalist. He played for Cambridge University before playing for Sussex County Cricket Club from 1951 to 1968. He captained both teams.

Early life
Marlar was born in Eastbourne, East Sussex on 2 January 1931. He was educated at King Edward VI School, Lichfield and Harrow School, before studying at Magdalene College, Cambridge. He played first-class cricket for Cambridge University, winning a blue in 1951, 1952 and 1953 (when he captained Cambridge to victory over Oxford).

Career
Marlar debuted for Sussex in July 1951 in a match against Kent held at the Central Recreation Ground in Hastings. He played with the club until 1968 and served as its captain between 1955 and 1959. An innovative off-break bowler, he took 970 wickets in 289 matches at an average of 25.22, with a personal best of 9/46 against Lancashire at Hove in 1955. He was described as "shrewd and skilful" by Wisden Cricketers' Almanack.

Outside cricket and later life
Marlar stood as a Conservative candidate for Bolsover in the 1959 General Election, and in a 1962 by-election at Leicester North East. Decades later he was a candidate at the 1993 Newbury by-election.

After retiring from professional cricket, Marlar had a successful journalistic career as an outspoken cricket correspondent of The Sunday Times, and wrote the illustrated history The Story of Cricket (1979). One noted example of his bluntness came in December 1987, when he described the conduct of umpires officiating a five-day international match against Pakistan "intolerable, because whether or not the umpires were cheating, that is the way it appeared", adding that it was worst crisis since 1932. In the mid-1970s, after the response to an article he wrote on cricket in Bangladesh, he successfully advocated the inclusion of Bangladesh into international cricket.

Marlar also started a thriving headhunting business based in Sloane Square and became a cricket administrator. He served as chairman of Sussex in 1996 and 1997, laying the foundations for the club's first Championship win in 2003. He was appointed president of Sussex County Cricket Club for 2005 and President of MCC for 2005–06. During this time he incurred some controversy when, on a declaration to the Sunday Telegraph, he described it as "absolutely outrageous" that female athletes play cricket with male athletes, in response to Holly Colvin and Sarah Taylor, who had both played for England, being chosen to play for Brighton College's First XI that summer.

Personal life
Marlar had six children who survived him.  He died on 30 September 2022 at Epsom Hospital.  He was 91 years old.

References

1931 births
2022 deaths
People educated at Harrow School
Alumni of Magdalene College, Cambridge
English cricketers
English male journalists
Referendum Party politicians
Sussex cricketers
Sussex cricket captains
Cambridge University cricketers
Presidents of the Marylebone Cricket Club
The Sunday Times people
Gentlemen cricketers
Marylebone Cricket Club cricketers
Gentlemen of England cricketers
Conservative Party (UK) parliamentary candidates
British sportsperson-politicians
Sportspeople from Eastbourne